Donough O'Brien may refer to:
Donough O'Brien (author) (born 1939), marketing, public relations executive and author
Donough O'Brien (cricketer) (1879–1953), Welsh-born Irish cricketer
Sir Donough O'Brien, 1st Baronet (1642–1717), Irish politician and baronet
Donough O'Brien, 16th Baron Inchiquin (1897–1968)
Donough O'Brien, 2nd Earl of Thomond (died 1553)
Donogh O'Brien, 4th Earl of Thomond (died 1624)
Donough O'Brien (died 1582)

See also
Donnchad mac Briain (died 1064), 11th-century king of Munster